Selena Gomez & the Scene was an American pop rock band from Los Angeles, California. Formed in 2008, its last lineup consisted of vocalist Selena Gomez, drummer Greg Garman, bassist Joey Clement, keyboardist Dane Forrest, and guitarist Drew Taubenfeld. The band released three studio albums, seven singles and nine music videos.

Their debut album, Kiss & Tell, was released on September 29, 2009, debuting at No. 9 on the US Billboard 200 and earning the band a Gold certification from the Recording Industry Association of America (RIAA) in March 2010. The second single from the album, "Naturally", reached the top thirty in the U.S., as well as the top twenty in New Zealand, the United Kingdom, Ireland, Canada, and Germany. The song has been certified Platinum in the U.S. and Canada. As of 2012, Kiss & Tell has sold over 900,000 copies in the U.S.

The band's second album, A Year Without Rain, was released on September 17, 2010, debuting at No. 4 on the U.S. Billboard 200 and earning the band a second RIAA Gold certification in January 2011. Two singles were released from the album, "Round & Round" and "A Year Without Rain". As of 2012, the album has sold over 800,000 copies in the U.S.

The band's third album, When the Sun Goes Down, was released on June 28, 2011, debuting at No. 4 on the U.S. Billboard 200. Its lead single "Who Says" received its radio premiere on On Air with Ryan Seacrest on March 8, 2011, followed by a music video premiere on Disney Channel on March 11. The song has been certified Platinum in the U.S. The second single from the album, "Love You like a Love Song", was released on June 17, 2011, and was certified 4× Platinum in the U.S. The third and final single from the album was "Hit the Lights". The band disbanded when Gomez began focusing on her acting career and solo music career.

The band has won numerous awards and accolades since their debut. They have won a total of four Poptastic Awards, including the Best Duo or Group Award. The band has also been nominated for five awards at the MuchMusic Video Awards, and two MTV Europe Music Awards. In 2011, the band won its first People's Choice Award for Breakout Group. In 2012, "Love You Like a Love Song" was nominated for an MTV Video Music Award, giving the band their first VMA nomination. The band has also won a total of six Teen Choice Awards since 2010, including Choice Music: Group and Choice Music: Love Song for "Love You like a Love Song".

History

2008–2009: Formation

Gomez first announced plans of forming a band in 2008, citing Paramore as an inspiration for the decision. In an interview with Jocelyn Vena of MTV News, Gomez said: "I'm going to be in a band. I'm not going to be a solo artist ... I don't want my name attached to it. I will be singing..." Gomez later announced on Twitter that her band would be called The Scene, an "ironic jab" at people who called Gomez a "wannabe scene". Gomez stated that her label, Hollywood Records, did not want her to have a band due to Gomez already having a "fan base", leading her to name the band Selena Gomez & the Scene to keep both herself and the label happy. In an interview with Z100 New York, Gomez stated that the band was formed through a long and exhausting audition process, saying: "I would like all guys in the band. I'm looking for someone who's very passionate about music and can show me that they can rock out. I like having people with me to lean on and write with and have fun with."

The band's original line-up featured Gomez on vocals, Ethan Roberts on lead guitar and backing vocals, Greg Garman on drums, Joey Clement on bass guitar, and Nick Foxer on keyboard and backing vocals. Gomez posted a video of the audition and interview process for band members as the fourth episode of a vlog series on her official YouTube channel titled Under Pressure. Shortly after the band was formed, Foxer left for unknown reasons, and was replaced by Dane Forrest. During a live performance for UNICEF in 2012, Gomez confirmed that Ethan Roberts would be leaving the group to pursue solo projects, with Gomez wishing him luck. He was replaced with Drew Taubenfeld that same year, though Taubenfeld does not provide backing vocals like Roberts did. The group has also featured various back-up singers during tours, including YouTube star Christina Grimmie, who toured with Gomez & the Scene in 2010.

2009–2010: Kiss & Tell and A Year Without Rain
The band's debut studio album, Kiss & Tell, was released on September 29, 2009. It includes collaborations with writers and producers such as Gina Schock of the Go-Go's and Rock Mafia. Predominantly a pop rock album, Kiss & Tell also incorporates a combination of other styles, including dance music. Being compared to releases by fellow Disney stars Miley Cyrus and Demi Lovato, the album was met with mixed reception, with some critics praising the album for its "fun" nature, and others criticizing Gomez's vocal performance. Kiss & Tell debuted at number 9 on the Billboard 200 in the US. It was later certified Gold in the country for sales exceeding 500,000 copies. It was successful in other territories as well, entering the Top 10 in Greece and Poland, as well as entering the Top 20 in the United Kingdom. To promote the album, Gomez & the Scene made numerous televised performances on shows such as season nine of Dancing with the Stars, The Ellen DeGeneres Show, Late Night with Jimmy Fallon, and Dick Clark's New Year's Rockin' Eve with Ryan Seacrest among other shows. The band also promoted the album with the concert tour, Selena Gomez & the Scene: Live in Concert. The band also contributed to Disney's All Wrapped Up Vol. 2. The EP includes the band's cover of "Winter Wonderland" as well as Christmas covers by other successful artists.

The band's lead single, "Falling Down" had minor commercial success, peaking at number 82 on the Billboard Hot 100, The music video premiered after the world premiere of Gomez' TV-movie Wizards of Waverly Place: The Movie on August 28, 2009. The single was described as being "pop-rock" by Bill Lamb of About.com, while Digital Spy compared it to music released by American singer Pink. Their single "Falling Down" was featured on Radio Disney Jams, Vol. 12, along with songs by other popular artists. Jams 12 was officially released on March 30, 2010. The second single from the album, "Naturally" was released on December 11, 2009, along with a music video for digital download. The music video was shot on November 14, 2009, and premiered on Disney Channel following the premiere of Phineas and Ferb Christmas Vacation on December 11, 2009. The single debuted at number 39 and later peaked at number 29 on the Billboard Hot 100 and has peaked at number 18 on the Canadian Hot 100. It is the band's biggest hit to date and first top 40 hit beating out their first single "Falling Down" and also their first number 1 hit on the Billboard Hot Dance Club Songs chart. "Naturally" had its highest peak in Hungary where it peaked at number 4 on the singles chart, becoming the band's first top five hit anywhere in the world. On July 15, 2010, the single was certified Platinum by the RIAA for sales of 1,000,000 in the US.

Following the success of Kiss & Tell, work on the band's second studio album began in 2010. The finished product, A Year Without Rain, was released on September 17, 2010. The album continues the dance-pop/electropop style of the group's hit single "Naturally". "I think we wanted to do something a little fun. We wanted to do a techno vibe, " said lead singer Selena Gomez. Gomez said in an interview with Z100 New York that it would feature some songs that did not make it onto the first album and that the rest of the band would be much more included on it. In an interview with MTV, Gomez said, "I'm really proud of this record, it's very different, and kind of shows [our] growth a little bit in music... I think if anything the lyrics are more powerful, in a way." The record was dedicated to her fans to thank them for their support. It debuted on the US Billboard 200 at number 4 with sales of a little over 66,000, barely selling more than Kiss & Tell. Much like the band's previous album, A Year Without Rain was certified Gold by the RIAA for sales exceeding 500,000 copies in the US. The album received a mixed to positive reviews where some noticed that Gomez's vocals contain the Auto-Tune effect. The record's two singles both receiving moderate success. The record's first single, "Round & Round", premiered on June 18, 2010. The accompanying music video, which was filmed in Budapest, premiered two days later. The single was released on June 22, 2010. The song has been certified Gold in the United States by the Recording Industry Association of America for shipments of 500,000 copies. It debuted at number 24 on the Billboard Hot 100, and 76 on the Canadian Hot 100. It also debuted at number 15 on the Billboard Hot Digital Songs chart and at number 47 in the UK. The album's second single and title track "A Year Without Rain" was released on September 7, 2010. The music video premiered on September 3, 2010, after the world premiere of Camp Rock 2: The Final Jam. The Spanish version of "A Year Without Rain" ("Un Año Sin Lluvia") was released three months after the English version. On July 13, Selena Gomez & the Scene's song "Live Like There's No Tomorrow" was released as a single from the movie Ramona and Beezus. The song is also a track on A Year Without Rain. Despite the success of the film, the song failed to chart on any major charts worldwide. As of 2012, the album has sold an estimated 609,000 copies in the United States, according to Billboard.

The album and subsequent singles were promoted mainly through televised performances and concert tours, much like with their previous album. Gomez & the Scene performed "Round & Round" live on shows such as America's Got Talent, Blue Peter, Daybreak, and MTV's The Seven, while performing "A Year Without Rain" on Good Morning America, The Ellen DeGeneres Show, and Lopez Tonight among other shows. On October 27, 2010, the band played an acoustic set for charity (UNICEF). They were also part of the Jingle Ball tour during December. In 2011, the band performed "A Year Without Rain" and won Favorite Breakout Artist on the Peoples Choice Awards, against Justin Bieber. The album was further promoted through the band's A Year Without Rain Tour, which was both critically and commercially successful. During a backstage interview, Gomez remarked that she was conceptualizing the tour as far as stage and production and promised an amazing show with an "epic" stage for 2011.

2011–2012: When The Sun Goes Down, hiatus, and split

On February 15, 2011, Hollywood Records confirmed that a new album was in the works. Though the album was initially titled Otherside, it was later changed to When the Sun Goes Down. the album was released on June 28, 2011. The album expanded on the pop and dance elements found on the band's last album, and features a more electropop and synthpop sound. The album also explores organic instrumentation. The sound of the album was compared to recent releases by artists such as Kelly Clarkson among others. When the Sun Goes Down featured writing credits from writers and producers such as pop icon Britney Spears, pop singer Katy Perry, and Rock Mafia, among others. The album received a mixed reviews with the album's second single receiving a 4× Platinum certification from the RIAA. The record debuted at number 4 on the Billboard 200 with sales of 78,000 copies in its first week of release. This marked the highest first week sales for the band to date, outselling their first two albums by nearly 12,000 copies. As of 2012, When the Sun Goes Down has sold an estimated 642,000 copies in the US alone.

The album's lead single "Who Says" had its world premiere on On Air with Ryan Seacrest on March 8. The accompanying music video, which was directed by Chris Applebaum, premiered on VEVO March 11. The single follows in succession of other self-empowerment singles such as "Firework" by Katy Perry, "Fuckin' Perfect" by Pink, and "Born This Way" by Lady Gaga. "Who Says" was a critical success but was only successful in US, receiving a moderate success worldwide, becoming the band's highest-peaking song on the Hot 100 chart to date, where it peaked at number 21. The song has also been certified Platinum by the RIAA, becoming their second single to achieve this feat. On May 28, Gomez announced on her official Twitter that one of the songs from the album, "Bang Bang Bang" would be released as part of an iTunes album countdown on June 7, 2011. Gomez later announced in an interview that the second single from the album would be "Love You like a Love Song". The song was serviced to contemporary hit radio airplay on August 16, 2011, in the United States. The single later went on to become the band's highest performing single in the U.S. to date, where it peaked at number 22 on the Hot 100 chart, their second highest-peaking single to date. The song became their highest-charting single on the Pop Songs chart based on radio airplay, where it peaked at No. 6. The single was later certified 4× Platinum in the U.S., making it the band's first song to achieve this feat. "Hit the Lights" was released as the third and final single in 2012, but it failed to have much success. On March 23, 2011, Hollywood Records announced the We Own the Night Tour, which began on July 24, 2011 and ended on February 11, 2012.

On January 7, 2012, Gomez announced that the band was on hiatus and that they would not release a new album in 2012. On July 22, 2012, Selena Gomez & the Scene won "Choice Music: Group" for the third time in a row at the 2012 Teen Choice Awards. Since then, the band has not reformed to release any new material, with Selena Gomez focusing solely on her solo career.

Members

Final line-up
 Selena Gomez – vocals 
 Greg Garman – drums 
 Joey Clement – bass guitar 
 Dane Forrest – keyboards 
 Drew Taubenfeld – guitar 

Former members
 Ethan Roberts – guitar, backing vocals 
 Nick Foxer – keyboards, backing vocals 

Touring members
 Lindsey Harper – backing vocals 
 Katelyn Clampett – backing vocals 
 Ashleigh Haney – backing vocals 
 Christina Grimmie – backing vocals

Discography

 Kiss & Tell (2009)
 A Year Without Rain (2010)
 When the Sun Goes Down (2011)

Tours
 Live in Concert (2009–2010)
 A Year Without Rain Tour (2010–2011)
 We Own the Night Tour (2011–2012)

Awards and nominations

See also
 List of artists who reached number one on the U.S. dance chart
 List of artists who reached number one on the U.S. dance airplay chart

References

 
Selena Gomez
American pop rock music groups
Hollywood Records artists
Musical groups established in 2008
Musical groups from Los Angeles
Musical groups disestablished in 2012
Electropop groups
Fascination Records artists
Universal Music Group artists